Franjo Šeper (2 October 1905 – 30 December 1981) was a Croatian Cardinal of the Roman Catholic Church. He served as Prefect of the Congregation for the Doctrine of the Faith from 1968 to 1981, and was elevated to the cardinalate in 1965. Before that, he served as the Archbishop of Zagreb between 1960 and 1969.

Life and Ministry
Born in Osijek, in the Austro-Hungarian Kingdom of Croatia-Slavonia (present-day Croatia), he and his family moved to Zagreb in 1910; his father was a tailor and his mother a seamstress. He started his seminary studies in Zagreb then at the Pontifical Gregorian University) in Rome. He was ordained to the priesthood by Archbishop Giuseppe Palica on 26 October 1930. 

His first pastoral assignments were in the Archdiocese of Zagreb and, in 1934, was appointed private secretary to the Archbishop. In 1941, father Šeper became the rector of the archdiocesan seminary, a post which he held for the next decade. On 22 July 1954 he was named Coadjutor Archbishop of Zagreb and Titular Archbishop of Philippopolis; he received his episcopal consecration on the following 21 September from Archbishop Josip Ujčić of Belgrade.

He succeeded Cardinal Aloysius Stepinac as Archbishop of Zagreb on 5 March 1960, and was created Cardinal-Priest of Ss. Pietro e Paolo a Via Ostiense by Pope Paul VI in the consistory of 22 February 1965.

Prefect of the Congregation of the Doctrine of the Faith

He was named Prefect of the Congregation for the Doctrine of the Faith (CDF) on 8 January 1968. Šeper was also the President of the International Theological Commission from its inception in April 1969, and the author of the 1973 document Mysterium Ecclesiae, which was written in order to re-orient the ecclesiology of the post-Vatican II period.

In 1974, the Congregation published a "Declaration on procured abortion", re-asserting the Church's opposition to the procedure since the publication of Humanae Vitae. It later published the document Persona Humana on the topic of sexual ethics.

In 1976, he was responsible for writing the statement Inter Insigniores, which firmly rejected the ordination of women in the Catholic Church. In 1980, he also wrote the CDF's declaration on Euthanasia, explaining the Church's view on ending life.

Šeper was a cardinal elector in the August and October conclaves of 1978.

Death and legacy
Pope John Paul II accepted Šeper's resignation as Prefect on 25 November 1981. He died on 30 December in Gemelli Hospital, where he had been hospitalized for a month. John Paul presided at his funeral Mass, and Šeper's body was later transferred to Zagreb, where it is buried beside the tomb of Cardinal Stepinac.

References

External links
Michael Davies's account of his 1980 meeting with Šeper
 Audio recordings with Franjo Šeper in the Online Archive of the Österreichische Mediathek. Interviews . Retrieved 2. March 2020

1905 births
1981 deaths
People from Osijek
People from the Kingdom of Croatia-Slavonia
Archbishops of Zagreb
Bishops appointed by Pope John XXIII
Roman Catholic archbishops in Yugoslavia
Participants in the Second Vatican Council
Croatian cardinals
20th-century cardinals
Members of the Congregation for the Doctrine of the Faith
Cardinals created by Pope Paul VI
Burials at Zagreb Cathedral